Sorting nexins are a large group of proteins that are localized in the cytoplasm and have the potential for membrane association either through their lipid-binding PX domain (a phospholipid-binding motif) or through protein–protein interactions with membrane-associated protein complexes  Some members of this family have been shown to facilitate protein sorting.

Family members 

In humans, sorting nexins are transcribed from the following genes:

Structure 

Sorting nexins either consist solely of a PX domain (e.g. SNX3) or have a modular structure made up of the PX and additional  domains.

A subgroup of sorting nexins (comprising, in humans, SNX1, SNX2, SNX4, SNX5, SNX6, SNX7, SNX8, SNX9, SNX18, SNX30, SNX32 and SNX33) possess a BAR domain at their C-terminus. (The BAR domain of SNXs 1, 2, 4, 7, 8 and 30 is classified by pfam as 'Vps5 C terminal like'.)

An example of a sorting nexin domain structure can be seen here for SNX1:

 NTD – N-terminal domain
 PX domain
 CTD – C-terminal BAR domain

References

External links
 

Proteins